The 2011–12 season was Chelsea Football Club's 98th competitive season, their 23rd consecutive season in the top flight of English football (20th in the Premier League), and their 106th year in existence as a football club. While their sixth place in the league was their lowest domestic finish since 2001–02, they completed a cup double by winning their seventh FA Cup and their first UEFA Champions League.

Kits
Supplier: Adidas / Sponsor: Samsung

Key dates
 22 June 2011: André Villas-Boas is appointed as the new manager on a three-year contract, with immediate effect.
 7 July 2011: Villas-Boas and the rest of the first team squad have their first training of the season together.
 13 July 2011: Chelsea win their first friendly match against Wycombe Wanderers.
 26 July 2011: Chelsea confirm Thibaut Courtois, a Belgian goalkeeper, as Villas-Boas' first signing. He is immediately loaned out to Atlético Madrid of La Liga.
 14 August 2011: Chelsea draw first match of the Premier League season away to Stoke City. It finishes 0–0 on Villas-Boas's debut as Chelsea manager.
 20 August 2011: Villas-Boas wins his first competitive match as a Chelsea manager after Chelsea defeat West Bromwich Albion 2–1 at Stamford Bridge.
 22 August 2011: Chelsea and Valencia agree a deal for Juan Mata, who signs for Chelsea for a fee rumoured to be £23.5 million.
 27 August 2011: Juan Mata scores on his debut match in a 3–1 home victory against Norwich City.
 27 August 2011: Chelsea and Guadalajara agree a deal for Ulises Dávila. He joins Chelsea on a five-year contract.
 31 August 2011: The transfer deadline day sees Raul Meireles join from Liverpool, whilst Yossi Benayoun and Patrick van Aanholt depart on seasonal loan deals. France Under-20 international Gaël Kakuta joins Bolton Wanderers on loan until 1 January 2012.
 18 September 2011: Chelsea suffer their first defeat of the season, losing 1–3 to Manchester United at Old Trafford. Fernando Torres scored Chelsea's goal.
 29 November 2011: Liverpool knock Chelsea out of the League Cup at the Quarter Final stage, winning 2–0 at Stamford Bridge. The loss is Chelsea's third in four games, and sixth of the season overall.
 3 December 2011: Manager André Villas-Boas confirms that Nicolas Anelka and Alex have been transfer listed, and banned from training with the first team, after handing in transfer requests to the club. Both will be allowed to resume full training if the transfer does not happen in the January transfer window. The announcement is made after the away match against Newcastle United, which Chelsea win 3–0.
 6 December 2011: Chelsea win their final Champions League group game against Valencia 3–0 to secure progress to the knockout stages. Racing Genk's 1–1 draw against Bayer Leverkusen means that Chelsea top Group E.

 12 December 2011: Chelsea become the first team in the 2011–12 edition of the Premier League to defeat leaders Manchester City. Chelsea come from behind in a fiery encounter by goals from Raul Meireles and a late penalty by Frank Lampard to turn the deficit into a victory.
 4 March 2012: Villas-Boas is sacked and removed of his duties by the director's board following a 0–1 defeat against West Bromwich Albion. Italian first team assistant manager Roberto Di Matteo Is officially appointed as caretaker manager until the end of the season.
 14 March 2012: Chelsea win their second match in the round of 16 of the UEFA champions league against Napoli with a 5–4 aggregate victory. Branislav Ivanović scores the winner in extra time to secure a spot in the quarter-finals. Following defeat of Arsenal by Milan and defeats of the Manchester clubs in their respective Europa League ties, Chelsea becomes the only remaining English representative in all European competitions.
 18 March 2012: Chelsea progress to the FA Cup semi-finals for a fifth time in seven years after beating Leicester City 5–2 at Stamford Bridge. Fernando Torres was the man of the match with two goals and two assists.
 4 April 2012: Chelsea progress to the Champions League semi-finals for the sixth time in the past nine seasons after beating Benfica 3–1 on aggregate.
 15 April 2012: Chelsea progress to the FA Cup final for the third time in four seasons, courtesy of a 5–1 win against Tottenham Hotspur. Controversy over Chelsea's second goal by Juan Mata adds to calls for goal-line technology.
 24 April 2012: Chelsea progress to the Champions League final in spectacular fashion, drawing 2–2 with Barcelona at Camp Nou despite playing with ten men for more than two-thirds of the game. Chelsea win 3–2 on aggregate.
 28 April 2012: Chelsea agree personal terms with Werder Bremen's Marko Marin. He is set to join in the summer.
 5 May 2012: Chelsea win the FA Cup for the seventh time after beating Liverpool 2–1 in the Final. Didier Drogba scores in his fourth FA Cup Final – a new record.
 19 May 2012: Chelsea win their first Champions League title, defeating Bayern Munich on penalties after a 1–1 draw in the Final. In doing so, Chelsea becomes the 22nd club to win the European Cup, the fifth English team and the first team from London to win the trophy.

Club

Coaching staff

Other information

|-
||Chief Executive|| Ron Gourlay
|-

|-
|}

Squads

First team squad

Premier League squad

  U21

 U21
 U21

 HG = Home Grown Player
 U21 = Under 21 Player
Source: 2011–12 Premier League squad

Reserve team

UEFA Champions League squad

 B = List B Player
 HG1 = Association-trained player
 HG2 = Club-trained player
Source: 2011–12 UEFA Champions League squad

Transfers

In

Summer

Winter

Out

Summer

Winter

Loan out

Overall transfer activity

Spending
Summer:  £60 million

Winter:  £21.2+ million

Total:   £81.2 million

Income
Summer:  £20.65 million

Winter:  £4.2+ million

Total:  £24.85 million

Expenditure
Summer:  £39.35 million

Winter:  £17 million

Total:  £56.35 million

Competitions

Overview

Pre-season and friendlies

Barclays Asia Trophy

Premier League

League table

Results summary

Results by round

Matches

UEFA Champions League

Group stage

Knockout phase

Round of 16

Quarter-finals

Semi-finals

Final

League Cup

FA Cup

Statistics

Appearances and goals
As of end of season

|-
|colspan="14"|Players who spent the season/part of the season out on loan, or left the club in January transfer window

|}

Goalscorers
As of end of season.

Clean sheets
As of end of season.

Disciplinary record
As of end of season.

Overall
As of end of season.

References

External links
 

2011–12
2011–12 Premier League by team
2011–12
2011–12 UEFA Champions League participants seasons